Lina Romay (born Rosa María Almirall Martínez; 25 June 1954 – 15 February 2012), a.k.a. Candy Coster and Lulu Laverne, was a Spanish actress who often appeared in films directed by her long-time companion (and later husband) Jesús Franco. She appeared in approximately 109 Jesus Franco films made over a 30-year period.

Biography
Romay was born in Barcelona in 1954. Following graduation from high school, she studied the arts, married actor/photographer Ramon Ardid (aka Raymond Hardy), and began acting in stage productions. She began appearing in Jesús Franco's films from the time that they met in 1972. Her husband Ramon was working for Franco as a still photographer at the time, and she met Franco through him. She acted in more than a hundred feature films, most of them directed by Franco. The majority of their films together were in the erotic film genre (including many X titles), but she was also featured in many of his horror, comedy and action/adventure films as well. Among the better known of her horror films are The Bare Breasted Countess (a.k.a. Female Vampire) (1973), Barbed Wire Dolls (1975) and Jack the Ripper (1976). Ramon co-starred with her in a number of Franco films until he realized she was leaving him for Franco in 1975. Lina and Ramon legally divorced in 1978.

She took the name Lina Romay from the actress and jazz artist from the 1940s. Although Romay was listed in the credits of several of Franco's films as a co-director, actor Antonio Mayans stated in a recent interview that Franco used to credit her in that manner for business reasons, although she never actually co-directed any of their films together. She did however contribute occasional story ideas and assist in the editing of some films and trailers.

Lina Romay and Jesús Franco lived as a couple for close to four decades, but only officially married on April 25, 2008. She died from cancer at the age of 57 on 15 February 2012, in Málaga, Spain. Franco died soon after in 2013.

Selected filmography
 The Erotic Rites of Frankenstein (1972) Lina's scenes as a gypsy girl only appear in the 1973 Spanish language version
 The Sinister Eyes of Dr. Orloff (1972) brief role as a neighbor
 Pleasure for Three (1973) aka How to Seduce a Virgin
 The Perverse Countess (1973)
 Maciste vs the Amazon Queen (1973)
 The Erotic Exploits of Maciste in Atlantis (1973)
 Female Vampire (1973) aka The Bare-Breasted Countess (released in 1975)
 Night of the Killers (1973)
 Linda's Hot Nights (1973) aka Who Raped Linda?
 Tender and Perverse Emanuelle (1973)
 Kiss Me Killer (1973)
 Exorcism and Black Masses (1974) aka Exorcisme
 Celestine, Maid at your Service (1974)
 Lorna the Exorcist (1974)
 Les Chatouilleuses (1974) aka Nuns in Madness
 Roland, the Sexiest Man in the World (1974)
 Les Emmerdeuses/ The Troublemakers (1974)
 The Obscene Mirror (1975) Lina only appeared in the 1975 re-edited hardcore Italian version of Jess Franco's 1973 film The Other Side of the Mirror
 Julietta 69 (1975) aka Justine, Lina only appeared in the 1975 re-edited hardcore Italian version co-edited by Joe D'Amato
 Midnight Party (1975) aka Lady Porno
 Rolls Royce Baby (1975) (not directed by Franco)
 Barbed Wire Dolls (1975)
 Women Behind Bars (1975)
 Downtown: The Naked Dolls of the Underworld (1975)
 Die Sklavinnen/ The Slaves (1975)
 Doriana Gray (1975)
 Jack the Ripper (1976)
 Ilsa, the Wicked Warden (a.k.a. Greta the Mad Butcher, 1976)
 Women Without Innocence (1977)
 Cocktail Special (1978)
 Elles Font Tout/ They Do It All (1978)
 Two Flowered Spies with Flowered Panties (1978) aka Opal of Fire The Girls of Copacabana (1979)
 Erotic Symphony (1979)
 The Sadist of Notre Dame (1979)
 What a Honeymoon (1979) a.k.a. The Gold Bug Mondo Cannibale (1980) a.k.a. White Cannibal Queen Sex Is Crazy (1980)
 Sexual Aberrations of a Married Woman (1980) a.k.a.Cecilia Eugenie: The Story of a Perversion (1980)
 The Girl in the Transparent Panties (1980)
 The Night of the Open Sexes (1981)
 Macumba Sexual (1981)
 Oasis of the Zombies (1981)
 Intimate Confessions of an Exhibitionist (1982)
 Black Boots, Leather Whip (1982)
 House of the Lost Women (1982)
 The Hotel of Love Affairs (1982)
 Mansion of the Living Dead (1982)
 The Shadow of Judoka vs. Dr. Wong (1982)
 Gemidos de Placer/ Moans of Pleasure (1982)
 The Blues of Pop Street (1983)
 Fury in the Tropics (1983)
 Revenge in the House of Usher (1983)
 The Treasure of the White Goddess (1983)
 Lillian the Perverted Virgin (1983)
 The Night Has a Thousand Sexes (1983)
 The Sexual Story of O (1983)
 Scarlet (1983)
 Camino Solitario/ Lonely Road (1983)
 Alone Against Terror (1983)
 Blood on my Shoes (1983)
 How Much Does a Spy Cost? (1983)
 Una Rajita Para Dos (1983) x-rated
 Bahia Blanca (1984)
 Last of the Filipinas (1985)
 Bangkok, Appointment with Death (1985)
 Travel to Bangkok, Coffin Included (1985)
 White Slave (1985) unreleased
 Lulu's Buttonhole (1985) x-rated
 Lulu's Pacifier (1985) x-rated
 Un Pito Para Tres (1985) x-rated
 Entre pitos anda el juego (1985) x-rated
 The Watcher and the Exhibitionist (1986) x-rated
 Las Chuponas (1986) x-rated
 Para Las Nenas Leche Calentita (1986) x-rated
 Slaves of Crime (1986)
 Teleporno (1986) unfinished x-rated project
 Bragueta Story (1986) unreleased
 Phollastia (1987) x-rated
 Falo Crest (1987) x-rated
 Faceless (1988) a.k.a. Predators of the Night Emerald Bay/ Esmeralda Bay (1987)
 Downtown Heat (1990)
 Killer Barbys (1996)
 Tender Flesh (1997)
 Lust for Frankenstein (1998)
 Mari-Cookie and the Killer Tarantula (1998)
 Dr. Wong's Virtual Hell (1999)
 Broken Dolls (1999)
 Red Silk (1999)
 Blind Target (2000)
 Helter Skelter (2001)
 Vampire Blues (2001)
 Vampire Junction (2001)
 Incubus (2002)
 Antenna Criminal (2002) documentary
 Killer Barbys vs. Dracula (2002)
 Flowers of Passion (2003)
 Flowers of Perversion (2003)
 Snakewoman (2005)
 Paula-Paula'' (2010)

References

External links
 
 Mexican horror film index

1954 births
2012 deaths
Spanish film actresses
Actresses from Barcelona
Film actresses from Catalonia
Deaths from cancer in Spain
Spanish pornographic film actresses